Disaster Report, known in Japan as  and in the PAL region as SOS: The Final Escape, is a PlayStation 2 survival action-adventure video game created by Irem. It was released in Japan in 2002 by Irem, and in North America and Europe in 2003, localized by Agetec. It is the first game in the Disaster Report series.

The game deals with the characters' survival and escape from the slow collapse of an artificial island. While dodging falling buildings and debris from periodic earthquakes, the player must find a way off the island. In addition, the main character, a reporter, must investigate the reasons for the disaster.

Gameplay
HP is the character's health and QP is the amount of energy the character has left. QP can be restored by drinking water. If the character becomes thirsty from running or other strenuous tasks, the player must provide the character with drinking water. If the player does not do this, the character begins to slowly lose health. Water can be drunk from clean taps or from bottled water filled up along the way. It is possible to give the character's companion water.

Ultimately, the aim of the game is to move through the city avoiding hazards and finding new routes through seemingly impassable hazards. When an aftershock strikes, the player must make Keith crouch, to keep him stable and safe from harm. Customisation of equipment can help Keith, or in the case of certain accessories, change his appearance. Items are stored in the players backpack, which has a limited number of slots, but larger backpacks can be collected. Friendly characters are unarmed.

Keith is accompanied by various companions. At one point, Keith has choice of companion, Karen or Kelly, both with different areas to explore and storylines to uncover. There are seven possible endings to the game.

The Japanese version is one of the few games to support the Rez Vibrator.

Plot
The year is 2001. After ten years of construction, the government announces to the world the completion of a top-secret project based in the Pacific Ocean, known as Stiver Island (Capital Island in the Japanese version). In a feat of revolutionary technology, the government used its top engineering talent to transform a minor spur of rock that barely stood above the ocean waves into a thriving man-made island, complete with a state-of-the-art metropolis called Capital City.

In June 2005, Keith Helm (Masayuki Sudō), the protagonist and player character is on his way to Capital City for the first time, to start his dream job as an editor for the prestigious Town Crier newspaper. Upon his arrival, an earthquake occurs. Soon after regaining consciousness, he comes across another survivor, Karen Morris (Mari Aizawa). They travel together as strong aftershocks continue until they meet a man named Greg Bach (Kōji Jin'nai).

Further on, the group decides to split up. Keith (the player) can either go with Karen to find her dog or go with Greg to help a girl named Kelly Austin (Natsumi Higa) find her brother Jason (Haruhiko). No matter whether the player accompanies Karen or Greg, Keith ends up at the Town Crier building. He meets William (Hideaki Nishiyama), who directs him to the construction company that built the island.

There it is revealed that the disaster was deliberate. After escaping the building Keith can either help a wounded William evacuate or leave him and Karen/Kelly so he can escape. William is evacuated and Keith goes to a stadium, where the player can switch which girl they are escorting.

Keith and Kelly/Karen are chased into an abandoned mall by the construction company's goons. After escaping they meet up with Greg, Kelly/Karen is evacuated, and they meet the man who oversaw Stiver Island's Construction - Terry Stiver (Yoshitaka Shinzaki). Terry tells them that he caused the quake to get revenge on the government because his family was killed in a landslide. Keith reveals to the man that his business partner Albert (Takumi Hatta) caused the landslide to make him want to destroy the island.

After escaping from an attack chopper in a river chase, they are again confronted when their makeshift boat lands on the Capital District. At this point, a mini-tsunami occurs, forcing them into a car showroom and up through it onto the roof.

Upon reaching the top the trio sees the chopper once again, which drops two enemies onto the building. While risking his life to save Karen/Kelly, Greg is shot by an enemy, after which the building "sinks" and the enemy is killed. Greg dies after asking Keith to write an exposé on the government's misdeeds in constructing the island.

Keith and Karen/Kelly then make their way into another skyscraper. Terry dies with Albert and depending on the player's relationship with Karen/Kelly, either ends with the two escaping, or them holding each other as the water rises towards them.

Development
Designer Kazuma Kujo has recounted that the game's setting was inspired by the disaster novel Japan Sinks, its film adaptation Submersion of Japan and the accounts of those who present for the Great Hanshin earthquake of 1995. Kujo had sought to "take advantage" of the PlayStation 2's processing power to replicate the feeling of living through a disaster, "and I thought it would be entertaining if I made a game where it wasn’t aliens and monsters attacking, but the city itself being a threat".

Reception

The game received "average" reviews according to the review aggregation website Metacritic. In Japan, Famitsu gave it a score of 32 out of 40.

Sequels
A sequel, Zettai Zetsumei Toshi 2: Itetsuita Kiokutachi, was released in Japan on March 30, 2006, and later released in America and Europe as Raw Danger!. A second sequel, Zettai Zetsumei Toshi 3: Kowareyuku Machi to Kanojo no Uta, was released for the PSP on April 23, 2009. This game was not released outside Japan. A fourth game, Zettai Zetsumei Toshi 4: Summer Memories, was scheduled for release on PlayStation 3 in April 2011, with 3D and Move support. However, the game was cancelled after the 2011 Tōhoku earthquake.

In December 2014, the creator of the Disaster Report series - Kazuma Kujo - bought the IP of the series from Irem for his company Granzella. Subsequently, Granzella re-released the existing Disaster Report games for download in Japan. The original game and the sequel Raw Danger! were re-released on PlayStation 2 and Zettai Zetsumei Toshi 3 for the PSP. Development for the fourth game was resumed and Granzella released three new teaser pictures and announced to release detailed information around autumn 2015. It was eventually released for PlayStation 4 as Disaster Report 4 Plus: Summer Memories in 2018, with a Nintendo Switch port released in 2020.

In December 2020, Granzella teased that prototyping and planning for the next game in the series, currently titled Disaster Report 5, had begun. No more news as of yet of this project nor the full title of the game.

References

External links

Official website 

2002 video games
Agetec games
Irem games
PlayStation 2 games
PlayStation Network games
Single-player video games
Survival video games
Video games about disasters
Video games developed in Japan
Video games set in 2001
Video games set in 2005
Video games set on islands